Bernard Julia (born 1952 in Paris) is a French theoretical physicist who has made contributions to the theory of supergravity.  He graduated from Université Paris-Sud in 1978,
and is directeur de recherche with the CNRS working at the École Normale Supérieure. In 1978, together with Eugène Cremmer and Joël Scherk, he constructed 11-dimensional supergravity.
Shortly afterwards, Cremmer and Julia constructed the classical Lagrangian for four-dimensional N=8 supergravity by dimensional reduction from the 11-dimensional theory.  Julia also studied spontaneous symmetry breaking and the Higgs mechanism in supergravity

Other work includes a study, with A. Zee, of particles called dyons that carry both electric and magnetic charges
and many papers on string theory, M-theory, and dualities.

In 1986, Julia was awarded the Prix Paul Langevin of the Société Française de Physique.

See also
 Primon gas

Notes

External links
 Bernard Julia's homepage

1952 births
20th-century French  physicists
21st-century French physicists
French string theorists
Living people
French National Centre for Scientific Research scientists